The Swiss Heritage Society (SHS) is a non-profit organisation dedicated to the advancement of Switzerland's architectural heritage. Its focus is on the preservation of important landmarks, the development of the structural environment, and the promotion of good architectural design.

The Swiss Heritage Society was founded in 1905, has about 17,000 members and publishes the magazine Heimatschutz/Sauvegarde quarterly.

The Swiss Heritage Society pursues its goals mainly with public relations activities, through publications, technical consulting in construction projects, advisory functions in planning committees, appraisals, legal action, and financial grants for pioneering projects. The SHS commends exemplary achievements by awarding prizes (Wakker Prize, Heimatschutz Prize, Schulthess Horticultural Prize). Together with Pro Natura, the SHS has been supporting the annual fundraising drive with chocolate talers (Schoggitaler) for over fifty years.

See also 
 Federal Inventory of Landscapes and Natural Monuments

External links
  Official website

Cultural organisations based in Switzerland
Cultural heritage of Switzerland
Historic preservation